Events in the year 2018 in Guyana.

Incumbents
President: David Granger
Prime Minister: Moses Nagamootoo

Events 

9 November – An aircraft accident shortly after departure from Cheddi Jagan International Airport

Deaths
17 February – Mohamed Shahabuddeen, judge and politician (b. 1931).
8 March – Wilson Harris, writer (b. 1921).
28 June – Abdul Kadir, politician and convicted terrorist (born c.1952)

References

 
2010s in Guyana
Years of the 21st century in Guyana
Guyana
Guyana